Ayotte is a surname. Notable people with the surname include:

 Kelly Ayotte (born 1968), former United States senator
 Leo Ayotte (1909–1976), artist
 Mark Ayotte (born 1964), referee

See also
 Ayotte Drums, drum producer
 Ayotte v. Planned Parenthood of Northern New England, a 2006 case in the US Supreme Court on the subject of abortion